Karl Klug (8 April 1925 – 11 January 1971) was a German footballer who competed in the 1952 Summer Olympics.

References

1925 births
1971 deaths
German footballers
Association football forwards
Olympic footballers of Germany
Footballers at the 1952 Summer Olympics
German footballers needing infoboxes